In Greek mythology, Isonoe, also called Isione or Hesione, was one of the Danaïdes. She was a lover of Zeus and bore a son by him, Orchomenos (or Chryses). After her death she was transformed by the god into a spring.

Notes

References 

 Pseudo-Clement, Recognitions from Ante-Nicene Library Volume 8, translated by Smith, Rev. Thomas. T. & T. Clark, Edinburgh. 1867. Online version at theio.com

Princesses in Greek mythology
Danaids